Holycross is a village and civil parish in County Tipperary, Ireland. It is one of 21 civil parishes in the barony of Eliogarty. The civil parish straddles two counties and the baronies of Eliogarty and of Middle Third (South Tipperary). It is also an ecclesiastical parish in the Roman Catholic Archdiocese of Cashel and Emly.

The village developed around the Cistercian Holy Cross Abbey on the River Suir. Its population was 715 at the 2016 census.

Transport
The Thurles to Clonmel via Cashel bus route serves Holycross. The nearest railway station is Thurles railway station at approximately 6 kilometres distance.

History

Holy Cross Abbey was founded in 1180 by King Domnall Mór Ua Briain and was renovated and added to during the 15th century. It became a place of pilgrimage when a relic of the True Cross was presented to the Cistercian monks. The monastery was suppressed by King Henry VIII during the 16th century. The Abbey was abandoned circa 1650, fell into ruin. The late Dr. Thomas Morris, Archbishop of Cashel and Emly, inspired the reconstruction of the Abbey which was opened in 1975. The church of this Cistercian Abbey was re-roofed and restored to its former glory as one of the finest Irish 15th-century churches. The foundation in 1169 was originally by the Benedictine order.

Relic
In 1975, on the restoration and reconsecration of the Abbey, an artifact, purportedly a relic of the true cross, was reinstated after several centuries. The relic was stolen, along with a number of other items in October, 2011. It was recovered and returned by Gardaí in January 2012.

Sport
Holycross–Ballycahill GAA is the local Gaelic Athletic Association club.

Holycross Football Club is a soccer club for juvenile and adult players located on the Cashel Road.

See also
 List of civil parishes of County Tipperary
 List of towns in the Republic of Ireland

References

External links
 Holycross Abbey website
 Holycross-Ballycahill GAA Club

 
 Holycross
Parishes of the Roman Catholic Archdiocese of Cashel and Emly
Towns and villages in County Tipperary